The 2018–19 South Dakota Coyotes women's basketball represent University of South Dakota in the 2018–19 NCAA Division I women's basketball season. The Coyotes, led by third year head coach Dawn Plitzuweit, compete in the Summit League. They play home games in Sanford Coyote Sports Center in Vermillion, South Dakota.

Previous season
The Coyotes went 29–7 overall and 14–0 in conference play finishing first in The Summit League. The Coyotes lost in the championship game of the 2018 Summit League Tournament to South Dakota State 50–65.

With the loss to South Dakota State in the conference tournament, the Coyotes automatically qualified to the 2018 WNIT. The Coyotes won their first three games against Houston, Colorado State, and Michigan State. But, would lose to TCU in the quarterfinals 71–79.

Roster

Schedule

|-
!colspan=9 style=| Non-conference regular season

|-
!colspan=9 style=| Summit League Regular Season

|-
!colspan=9 style=| The Summit League Women's Tournament

|-
!colspan=9 style=| NCAA Women's Tournament

Rankings
2018–19 NCAA Division I women's basketball rankings

References

South Dakota Coyotes women's basketball seasons
South Dakota
South Dakota Coyotes women's basketball
South Dakota Coyotes women's basketball
South Dakota